Nina Meredith Springle (born 6 March 1973) is an Australian politician. She was a Greens member of the Victorian Legislative Council, having represented South Eastern Metropolitan Region from 2014 to 2018.

In 2014 Springle became the first Greens MP to represent the South Eastern Metropolitan Region in Victoria's Parliament. Springle has worked as a consultant in the community and education sectors.

During her term of office, Springle was the Victorian Greens spokesperson for Families and Children, Multicultural Affairs, Women, Health, Youth Justice, Prevention of Family Violence, Older People, Employment, Industrial Relations, Industry & Trade, Small Business, Digital Rights and Waste Management.

Nina Springle initiated the "Plastic Free Sea" campaign, which aims to stop marine plastic pollution in Victoria, and has worked on developing a container deposit scheme to reduce plastic and metal litter.

Springle was appointed the first Deputy Leader of the Victorian Greens on 12 October 2017, a role she retained until losing her seat at the 2018 state election. She resigned from the party after the election, citing dissatisfaction with the "party establishment" and its response to the loss of seats.

On 9 November 2022, Springle announced that she had joined the Reason Party, and would be contesting the North-Eastern Metropolitan Region in the Legislative Council at the 2022 state election.

References

External links
 Parliamentary voting record of Nina Springle at Victorian Parliament Tracker

1973 births
Living people
Australian Greens members of the Parliament of Victoria
Members of the Victorian Legislative Council
Members of the Victorian Legislative Council for South Eastern Metropolitan Region
Deakin University alumni
Women members of the Victorian Legislative Council